The Northrup-Gilbert House is a historic home located at Phoenix in Oswego County, New York.   It is a -story frame residence that appears to have been built in the 1840s.  It has Greek Revival–style details.

It was listed on the National Register of Historic Places in 2000.

References

Houses on the National Register of Historic Places in New York (state)
Houses completed in 1840
Houses in Oswego County, New York
National Register of Historic Places in Oswego County, New York